Gil da Cruz Trindade (born 1 March 1982) is an athlete from East Timor. He was the first, along with Aguida Amaral, to represent East Timor at the Olympics, competing in the marathon of the 2004 Summer Olympics in Athens, Greece. Trindade entered the race at the invitation of the International Olympic Committee, who sent him $250 and a plane ticket to Greece. While his only wish was to finish the race, Trindade failed to finish the marathon.

Achievements
All results regarding marathon, unless stated otherwise

References

External links
 

1982 births
Living people
East Timorese male long-distance runners
Athletes (track and field) at the 2004 Summer Olympics
Olympic athletes of East Timor
East Timorese male marathon runners